The German Army Training Schools are the training establishments of the German Army, alongside the Army Training Centres (Zentren des Heeres).

Command 
The training schools are subordinated to the Army Office. The commander of all training schools is the Deputy Head of the Army Office. Most of the German Army training schools are responsible for the continuation training of a specific arm of service. The commander of each school is usually also the General of the Artillery, General of the Infantry, General of the Armoured Corps, etc. This appointment, despite the name, may be filled by a colonel (Oberst); most however are filled by an officer holding the rank of brigadier general (Brigadegeneral).

Since 2008 the Commander of Army Training Schools has been Brigadegeneral Heinrich Fischer who is based in the Army Office at Cologne.

Organisation 

The individual training schools are:

 School of NBC and Self-Protection (ABC- und Selbstschutzschule) at Sonthofen
 School of Artillery (Artillerieschule) at Idar-Oberstein
 Idar-Oberstein Officer Training Battalion (Offizieranwärterbataillon) at Idar-Oberstein
 School of Mountain and Winter Warfare (Gebirgs- und Winterkampfschule) at Mittenwald
 School of Army Aviation (Heeresfliegerwaffenschule), Bückeburg
 School of Infantry (Infanterieschule) at Hammelburg
 Hammelburg Officer Training Battalion (Offizieranwärterbataillon Hammelburg)
 School of Airborne and Air Transport (Luftlande- und Lufttransportschule) at Altenstadt
 Army Officer Training School (Offizierschule des Heeres) at Dresden
 School of Engineering and Army Construction Engineering College (Pionierschule und Fachschule des Heeres für Bautechnik) at Ingolstadt
 Land Systems School of Technology and Army Technical College (Technische Schule Landsysteme und Fachschule des Heeres für Technik) at Aachen
 Army NCO Training School (Unteroffizierschule des Heeres) at Weiden, Delitzsch, Münster

The officer cadets carry out their service in officer training battalions that are attached to two arms schools and at the Army Air Defence Training Centre (Ausbildungszentrum Heeresflugabwehrtruppe)

See also 
German Army Training Centres

External links
Website mit Links zu den Schulen des Heeres
Bundesarchiv zu den Schulen

German Army (1956–present)